Claytonia rubra is a species of wildflower in the family Montiaceae known by the common names redstem springbeauty and erubescent miner's lettuce. It is native to western North America from southwestern Canada to the Transverse Range of California, U. S. A. (and east to the Black Hills of South Dakota, U. S. A., where it is found in coniferous forests and shrublands. This is an annual herb with stems up to about 15 centimeters long.  Some individuals may overwinter as biennials. The basal leaves have small rounded to diamond-shaped blades on long, tapering petioles. There are also leaves on the stem which may be rounded or squared and sometimes fuse together to create a bowl around the stem.  All the leaves possess blunt (obtuse) tips according to published descriptions and taxonomic treatments. The herbage is red or pink in color at all stages of development. The inflorescence is a dense cluster of up to 30 tiny flowers, each with petals less than 4 millimeters long and white to pink-tinted in color.  Together with Claytonia perfoliata and Claytonia parviflora, Claytonia rubra comprises what is almost certainly a polyploid pillar complex based on three diploid species, each occupying a definitive ecological niche

There are two subspecies of Claytonia rubra:  Claytonia rubra subsp. depressa and Claytonia rubra subsp. rubra

References

External links
 Flora North America Treatment: Claytonia rubra
Jepson Manual Treatment
Photo gallery

Plants described in 1893
rubra
Flora of North America